The San Acacia Diversion Dam is a structure built in 1934 for the Middle Rio Grande Conservancy District (MRGCD) near to San Acacia, New Mexico, United States.
It diverts water from the Rio Grande into irrigation canals.

Structure

There are significant archeological sites along the left abutment of the diversion dam and the river embankments. 
Scour by the river on the bank here was causing persistent bank erosion.

The dam was built in 1934 and rehabilitated by the Bureau of Reclamation in 1957 as part of the Middle Rio Grande Project.
The dam diverts river water into the Socorro Main Canal operated by the MRGCD.
It can also divert water into the Low Flow Conveyance Channel, operated by the United States Bureau of Reclamation.  

Impact

A 2003 report noted that there had been silting upstream of the dam but the width of the downstream channels had decreased sharply since the diversion dam was built.  The river has cut a deeper channel in its bed and now runs faster.  This made it harder for fish to travel upstream.
The report suggested that if eight Gradient Restoration Facilities were installed in the downstream reach, that should be enough to slow the water, allowing sediment to settle and making fish passage easier.
A 2005 report considered removing the dam altogether.  Again, it suggested emplacement of Gradient Restoration Facilities to control erosion as sediment above and below the dam returned to normal levels.

Concerns about the survival of the endangered Rio Grande silvery minnow raised in Rio Grande Silvery Minnow v. Bureau of Reclamation
led to the United States Bureau of Reclamation working with the United States Fish and Wildlife Service (USFWS) to try to rescue the fish.
A number of projects are being undertaken to restore the silvery minnow's habitat, including a study of ways to allow the fish to pass the diversion dam.
A requirement for a fish passage was given in the Biological Opinion (BO) issued in March 2003 by the USFWS.
Water has been released from upstream reservoirs to supply more water to the habitat of the silvery minnow, and the Department of Reclamation is leasing water from the owners of water rights for this purpose.  Water from the Low Flow Conveyance Channel is being pumped into sections of the river that regularly run dry.

References
Citations

Sources

Dams in New Mexico
Buildings and structures in Socorro County, New Mexico
Dams completed in 1934
United States local public utility dams
Dams on the Rio Grande
1934 establishments in New Mexico